The East Windsor Regional School District is a comprehensive regional public school district in Mercer County, New Jersey, which serves students in pre-kindergarten through twelfth grade from East Windsor and Hightstown Borough.

As of the 2020–21 school year, the district, comprised of six schools, had an enrollment of 5,123 students and 466.0 classroom teachers (on an FTE basis), for a student–teacher ratio of 11.0:1.

The district is classified by the New Jersey Department of Education as being in District Factor Group "GH", the third-highest of eight groupings. District Factor Groups organize districts statewide to allow comparison by common socioeconomic characteristics of the local districts. From lowest socioeconomic status to highest, the categories are A, B, CD, DE, FG, GH, I and J.

Public school students in seventh through twelfth grades from Roosevelt Borough (a community in Monmouth County are sent to the district's schools as part of a sending/receiving relationship with the Roosevelt Public School District.

Awards and recognition
Fourteen EWRSD teachers were selected to participate in Princeton University's "Teachers as Scholars" Program (TAS) for the 2005–2006 school year. Started at Harvard University in 1996 and brought to Princeton in 2000, the TAS program offers a variety of seminars and workshops for school district teachers in a university setting, taught by the faculty and staff of Princeton University.

Schools 
Schools in the district (with 2020–21 enrollment data from the National Center for Education Statistics) are:
Elementary schools
Walter C. Black Elementary School with 491 students in grades K-2
Heather Gladkowski, Principal
Ethel McKnight Elementary School with 539 students in grades K-2
Nicole Foulks, Principal
Perry L. Drew Elementary School with 567 students in grades 3-5
Robert Dias, Principal
Grace N. Rogers Elementary School with 561 students in grades PreK / 3-5
Lori Emmerson, Principal
Middle school
Melvin H. Kreps Middle School with 1,237 students in grades 6-8
Samantha Felicetta, Principal
High school
Hightstown High School with 1,658 students in grades 9-12
Dennis M. Vinson Jr., Principal

Administration
Core members of the district's administration are:
Mark Daniels, Superintendent
Paul Todd, Business Administrator / Board Secretary

Board of education
The district's board of education, comprised of nine members, sets policy and oversees the fiscal and educational operation of the district through its administration. As a Type II school district, the board's trustees are elected directly by voters to serve three-year terms of office on a staggered basis, with three seats up for election each year held (since 2012) as part of the November general election. The board appoints a superintendent to oversee the district's day-to-day operations and a business administrator to supervise the business functions of the district. The seats on the board of education are allocated based on the population of the constituent municipalities, with seven seats assigned to East Windsor and two to Hightstown.

References

External links 

School Data for the East Windsor Regional School District, National Center for Education Statistics

East Windsor, New Jersey
Education in Monmouth County, New Jersey
Hightstown, New Jersey
School districts in Mercer County, New Jersey
New Jersey District Factor Group GH